Steven James Menashi (born January 15, 1979) is an American lawyer who serves as a United States circuit judge of the United States Court of Appeals for the Second Circuit.

Early life and education 
Menashi was born in 1979 in White Plains, New York. Menashi's grandparents were Jewish immigrants from Iraq and Ukraine; his maternal grandfather's relatives were murdered in the Holocaust.

Menashi graduated from Dartmouth College in 2001 with a Bachelor of Arts magna cum laude. He worked at the Hoover Institution from 2001 to 2004, and from 2004 to 2005 he was an editorial writer for The New York Sun. He then attended Stanford Law School, where he was an editor of the Stanford Law Review. He graduated in 2008 with a Juris Doctor and was inducted into the Order of the Coif.

Legal career
Menashi served as a law clerk to Judge Douglas H. Ginsburg of the U.S. Court of Appeals for the District of Columbia Circuit from 2008 to 2009. From 2009 to 2010, he was at Georgetown University Law Center as an Olin-Searle Fellow, a program offered by the Federalist Society. He then clerked for Justice Samuel Alito of the U.S. Supreme Court from 2010 to 2011. 

From 2011 to 2016, Menashi worked in the New York City office of the law firm Kirkland & Ellis, where he became a partner. While at Kirkland & Ellis, Menashi was a Research Fellow at the New York University School of Law and the Opperman Institute for Judicial Administration for three years, from 2013 to 2016.

From 2016 to 2017, Menashi was an assistant professor of law at George Mason University's Antonin Scalia Law School, where he focused on administrative law and civil procedure.

Trump administration 
He took a leave of absence beginning in 2017, to become the deputy general counsel for postsecondary service at the United States Department of Education, and to serve as general counsel on an acting basis for that department as of May 24. At the Department of Education, Menashi helped devise a plan by the Department of Education to deny debt relief for thousands of students who claimed to have been cheated by for-profit colleges. The plan, which used students' private Social Security data, was ruled illegal by a federal judge. His role as acting general counsel ended on April 23, 2018, after Carlos G. Muñiz was confirmed to that position by the U.S. Senate.

In September 2018, Menashi moved to the White House to become a Special Assistant to the President and Associate Counsel to the President.

Federal judicial service 

On August 14, 2019, President Donald Trump announced his intent to nominate Menashi to serve as a United States Circuit Judge of the United States Court of Appeals for the Second Circuit. On September 9, 2019, his nomination was sent to the Senate. That same day, the American Bar Association rated Menashi as "well qualified," its highest rating. He has been nominated to the seat vacated by Dennis Jacobs, who assumed senior status on May 31, 2019.

On September 11, 2019, a hearing on Menashi's nomination was held before the Senate Judiciary Committee. During his hearing, Menashi was criticized by senators from both parties for refusing to answer their questions regarding the legal advice he gave on the Trump administration's immigration policies. He was also questioned about an article he had written in the University of Pennsylvania Journal of International Law about ethnonationalism and Israel.  On November 7, 2019, his nomination was reported out of committee by a 12–10 vote. On November 13, 2019, the Senate invoked cloture by a 51–44 vote. On November 14, 2019, his nomination was confirmed by a 51–41 vote. He received his judicial commission the same day.

See also 
 Donald Trump judicial appointment controversies
 List of Jewish American jurists
 List of law clerks of the Supreme Court of the United States (Seat 8)

References

External links 
 

1979 births
Living people
21st-century American judges
21st-century American lawyers
American people of Iraqi-Jewish descent
American people of Ukrainian-Jewish descent
Dartmouth College alumni
Federalist Society members
George Mason University School of Law faculty
Judges of the United States Court of Appeals for the Second Circuit
People associated with Kirkland & Ellis
Law clerks of the Supreme Court of the United States
Lawyers from New York City
Lawyers from Washington, D.C.
New York (state) lawyers
New York University School of Law faculty
People from White Plains, New York
Stanford Law School alumni
Trump administration personnel
United States court of appeals judges appointed by Donald Trump